Amerio or Amério is an Italian surname. Notable people with the surname include:

Luigi Amerio (1912–2004), Italian electrical engineer and mathematician
Romano Amerio (1905–1997), Swiss Roman Catholic theologian
Sandy Amerio (born 1973), French film director

Italian-language surnames